Barça TV is a Spanish television channel operated by FC Barcelona. The channel is available in Catalan, Spanish and English. It is located at the Camp Nou stadium in Barcelona.

FC Barcelona media

R@dio Barça
R@dio Barça is a Spanish radio network operated by FC Barcelona on its official website. Match commentaries are available on R@dio Barça for all first team games, including friendlies.  In order to gain as wide an audience as possible, broadcasts are in three languages: Catalan, English and Spanish.

BARÇA Magazine
Since November 2002, the Journal is publishing BARÇA that, bimonthly, Club members receive and subscribers who wish in your current casa. La official magazine, covering the gap left by 'The Club veu' ('the Voice of the Club '), usually 68 pages in which information is power reflection and analysis about FC Barcelona, fleeing from the voracity of the day to day Club. The specific stories are interwoven with sections number still, like 'We talk to ...', 'What happened?', 'What a night!', 'The ex ...', 'the Thing' and 'Treasures', among others, which extend the recognition of people linked to the Bank and historical chapters of FC Barcelona. In addition, a large section of the news service reports, offers and promotions that are available to members of the Department of Communication Club.El Club is who assumes the development of information content, although some numbers are used to having the collaboration and the opinion of recognized personalities that complement each copy with input criteria and with a very specialized. Meanwhile, the Marketing Department is in charge of commercial coordination.

References
General

Specific

External links
Barça TV

FC Barcelona
Mass media in Barcelona
Sports mass media in Catalonia
Television stations in Catalonia
Catalan-language television stations
Catalan-language radio stations
Television channels and stations established in 1996
Football club television channels